Hot Country Songs is a record chart that ranks the top-performing country music songs in the United States, published by Billboard magazine.  In 1973, 36 different singles topped the chart, at the time published under the title Hot Country Singles, in 52 issues of the magazine.  Chart placings were based on playlists submitted by country music radio stations and sales reports submitted by stores.

At the start of the year, the number one song was "She's Got to Be a Saint" by Ray Price, which had reached number one the previous week, and remained atop the chart for two weeks in 1973. Price returned to the top spot for a single week later in the year with "You're the Best Thing That Ever Happened to Me". This marked his final appearance at the top of the Hot Country Singles chart, fifteen years after he had been at number one on the very first combined country sales and airplay chart published by Billboard. Conway Twitty spent the highest number of weeks at number one by any artist in 1973 with six, including one week at the top with a duet with Loretta Lynn. Twitty and Lynn had a run of success with duet recordings in the early 1970s alongside their ongoing solo careers, and each had three number one singles during the year, tying with Charley Pride, Tammy Wynette and Merle Haggard for the most number ones by an artist.  Despite being banned by some radio stations due to its lyrical content, Twitty's "You've Never Been This Far Before" spent three weeks at number one, tying for the longest unbroken run of the year with "The Most Beautiful Girl" by Charlie Rich.

Artists to reach number one for the first time in 1973 included Tanya Tucker, who took "What's Your Mama's Name" to the top spot at the age of 14. Later in the year, another 14-year old, Marie Osmond, reached the top spot with "Paper Roses".  She became the first female solo artist to top the chart with her debut single and set a new record as the youngest female artist to top the chart. A number of other artists achieved a first country number one in 1973.  Joe Stampley was the first when he spent one week at the top of the chart with "Soul Song" in January. In March, Cal Smith topped the chart for the first time with "The Lord Knows I'm Drinking", as did Barbara Fairchild with "The Teddy Bear Song". In April, Charlie Rich gained his first number one with "Behind Closed Doors", beginning a run of five consecutive first-time chart-toppers which also included Roy Clark with "Come Live with Me", Tucker's "What's Your Mama's Name", "Satin Sheets" by Jeanne Pruett, and Johnny Rodriguez's "You Always Come Back to Hurting Me". In July, Kris Kristofferson, who had written a number of major hits including "Me and Bobby McGee", which had topped the Billboard Hot 100 for Janis Joplin, achieved his only number one as a solo performer with "Why Me". The final number one of the year was the aptly-titled "If We Make It Through December" by Merle Haggard.

Chart history

See also
1973 in music
List of artists who reached number one on the U.S. country chart

References

1973
1973 record charts
Country